Alkinos Tsilimidos (born 1966) is an Australian film and theatre director. He has won the Montréal First Film Prize at the Montréal World Film Festival for his 1994 film Everynight ... Everynight. He primarily works as an indie film maker and has achieved many international festival awards. 

Tsilimidos was born in Melbourne and raised in a middle-class family in Doncaster, Victoria. He is of Greek descent.

Filmography
Everynight... Everynight (1994)
Silent Partner (2001)
Tom White (2004)
Em4Jay (2006)

Stage productions
Red (2012)
The Mountaintop (2013)
Glengarry Glen Ross (2014)

References

External links
 
 A walk on the White side (20 August 2004) The Age (Retrieved 9 March 2008)

1966 births
Living people
Australian film editors
Australian film producers
Australian screenwriters
Australian people of Greek descent
Film directors from Melbourne
People from Doncaster, Victoria